Homotrysis macleayi is a species of darkling beetles native to Australia. It is an established exotic in New Zealand.

References

External links
 NatureWatch NZ

Alleculinae
Beetles of Australia
Beetles described in 1909